The 10th Arabian Gulf Cup was held in Kuwait, between 21 February to 9 March 1990. All matches were played at Peace & Friendship Stadium.

Saudi Arabia withdrew before the tournament, as they considered that the horses in the competition logo were a reference to two animals used by the Kuwaitis in the Battle of Jahra in 1920. Iraq also withdrew while the tournament was still running, complaining about the referee on their tie with the UAE.

Matches 

Annulled games

Result

References

External links 
 Official Site (Arabic)
 RSSSF page

1990
1990 in Asian football
1990
1989–90 in Qatari football
1989–90 in Bahraini football
1989–90 in Emirati football
1989–90 in Kuwaiti football
1989–90 in Iraqi football
1990 in Kuwaiti sport